Pentimento is the 2002 debut album by singer Jessica Molaskey performing standards of the 1920s and 1930s. She is joined by an all-star cast of musicians, including her husband John Pizzarelli, father-in-law Bucky Pizzarelli, violinist Johnny Frigo and her brother-in-law, Martin Pizzarelli.

Track listing

Personnel
Jessica Molaskeyvocals
John Pizzarelliguitar, vocals, arrangements
Martin Pizzarellidouble-bass
Tony Tedescopercussion
Johnny Frigoviolin
Jesse Levycello
Larry Goldingspiano, arrangements
Ken Peplowskiclarinet
Bucky Pizzarelliguitar, ukulele

References

2002 debut albums
Jessica Molaskey albums